Thomas Earp may refer to:
 Thomas Earp (politician)
 Thomas Earp (sculptor)